Montañas Mayas Chiquibul is a biosphere reserve in the north of Guatemala.

References

External links 
 Parkswatch

Biosphere reserves of Guatemala